is a Japanese four-panel yuri manga series by Kuzushiro. It was serialized in Ichijinsha's Comic Yuri Hime from November 2011 to February 2017. Six tankōbon volumes have been collected. An anime television series adaptation by Seven aired in Japan from April to June 2014.

Plot
Yachiyo Inugami is a dog-like girl who loves cats, whilst Suzu Nekoyama is a cat-like girl who loves dogs. When the two meet, an instant attraction is formed between the two.

Characters

Sixteen years old. Despite having a dog-like surname and personality, she is a cat lover. She is quite perverted and somewhat of a masochist.  In the anime, when she is happy or excited, her ponytail will wag like a dog's tail.

Sixteen years old. The polar opposite of Yachiyo, as she has a cat-like surname and personality, but loves dogs.

Yachiyo's friend and Suzu's classmate, who often serves as the straight man trying to bring Yachiyo and Suzu's relationship back down to reality.

Yachiyo's classmate who, like a mouse, eats a lot of cheese and is generally nocturnal. She is a member of the biology club.

Mikine's senior in the biology club who, much like her cow-like name suggests, has ample breasts.

The class president of Yachiyo's class. She hates being referred to as a monkey because of her name, even though she displays various monkey traits now and again.

Sora's bird-like childhood friend, who is often absent from class due to her poor health.

Suzu's older sister who often dates several women and has constant hangovers.

Media

Manga
Inugami-san to Nekoyama-san started as a four-panel yuri manga series, drawn by Kuzushiro. The manga was serialized in Ichijinsha's Comic Yuri Hime from November 18, 2011, to February 18, 2017. Additionally, the series was released online in Niconico's web manga magazine Niconico Yuri Hime on February 18, 2013. Six tankōbon volumes were published.

Anime 
An anime television series adaptation aired in Japan from April 10 to June 26, 2014 on TV Saitama, with later airings on KBS, tvk, AT-X and Sun TV, and was also simulcast on Niconico, Bandai Channel, and Crunchyroll. The series was directed, produced and written by Shinpei Nagai at studio Seven. The series was released on Blu-ray Disc and DVD on July 18, 2014, and includes an unaired episode.

Episode list

References

External links
 
 

2010s LGBT literature
2014 Japanese television series endings
Anime series based on manga
Ichijinsha manga
Japanese LGBT-related animated television series
Japanese webcomics
Romantic comedy anime and manga
Seven (animation studio)
Yonkoma
Yuri (genre) anime and manga